Dimitrios Botsaris (1813–1871) was a Greek Army officer and Minister for Military Affairs.

D. Botsaris was the son of Markos Botsaris, hero of the Greek War of Independence and captain of the Souliotes. After his father's death (1823) and the independence of Greece (1828) he studied in Munich, Germany, and later became an officer in the Greek Army (artillery). Dimitrios Botsaris became also three times Minister for Military Affairs (Greece) under kings Otto and George I.

See also 
 Markos Botsaris
 Kostas Botsaris

References

1813 births
1871 deaths
Souliotes
Hellenic Army officers
Ministers of Military Affairs of Greece
19th-century Greek military personnel